Periglypta is a genus of bivalves in the subfamily Venerinae of the family Veneridae.

Species
According to the World Register of Marine Species, this genus has seven extant species. There are five fossil species listed in Fossilworks.
Periglypta caesarina  (W.H. Dall, 1903)
Periglypta caribbeana Anderson, 1927
 Periglypta corbis (Lamarck, 1818)
 Periglypta crispata (Deshayes, 1854)
 Periglypta exclathrata (Sacco, 1900)
 Periglypta listeri (J.E. Gray, 1838) – Princess Venus clam
 Periglypta multicostata (G. B. Sowerby I, 1835)
 Periglypta puerpera (Linnaeus, 1771)
 Periglypta reticulata (Linnaeus, 1758)
Periglypta tamiamensis A.A. Olsson & R.E. Petit, 1964 
Periglypta tarquinia  (W.H. Dall, 1900) 
 Periglypta valentichscotti Thach, 2021
Periglypta weegeeree

Synonyms
 Periglypta albocancellata (M. Huber, 2010): synonym of Periglypta exclathrata (Sacco, 1900)
 Periglypta chemnitzi (Hanley, 1845),synonym of Antigona chemnitzii (Hanley, 1845)
 Periglypta clathrata (Deshayes, 1854): synonym of Periglypta exclathrata (Sacco, 1900)
 Periglypta compressa Zhuang, 1964: synonym of Periglypta corbis (Lamarck, 1818)
 Periglypta edmonsoni Dall, Bartsch & Rehder, 1938: synonym of Periglypta reticulata (Linnaeus, 1758)
 Periglypta puerpura [sic]: synonym of Periglypta puerpera (Linnaeus, 1771) (misspelling)
 Periglypta sowerbyi (Deshayes, 1853): synonym of Antigona sowerbyi (Deshayes, 1854)

In addition, Markus Huber (2010) mentioned that Periglypta and Antigona are synonyms, but Chen et al. (2011) rejected this opinion.

References

 Huber, M. (2010). Compendium of bivalves. A full-color guide to 3,300 of the world's marine bivalves. A status on Bivalvia after 250 years of research. Hackenheim: ConchBooks. 901 pp., 1 CD-ROM. 
 Coan, E. V.; Valentich-Scott, P. (2012). Bivalve seashells of tropical West America. Marine bivalve mollusks from Baja California to northern Peru. 2 vols, 1258 pp.

External links
 Röding, P.F. (1798). Museum Boltenianum sive Catalogus cimeliorum e tribus regnis naturæ quæ olim collegerat Joa. Fried Bolten, M. D. p. d. per XL. annos proto physicus Hamburgensis. Pars secunda continens Conchylia sive Testacea univalvia, bivalvia & multivalvia. Trapp, Hamburg. viii, 199 pp.
 Jukes-Browne, A. J. 1914. A Synopsis of the Family Veneridae. Part 1. Proceedings of the Malacological Society of London 11: 58-74

Veneridae
Bivalves of Asia
Bivalve genera